Desiderius Erasmus Roterodamus (English: Erasmus of Rotterdam or Erasmus; 28 October 1466 – 12 July 1536) was a Dutch philosopher and Catholic theologian who is considered one of the greatest scholars of the northern Renaissance. As a Catholic priest, he was an important figure in classical scholarship who wrote in a pure Latin style. Among humanists he was given the sobriquet "Prince of the Humanists", and has been called "the crowning glory of the Christian humanists". Using humanist techniques for working on texts, he prepared important new Latin and Greek editions of the New Testament, which raised questions that would be influential in the Protestant Reformation and Catholic Counter-Reformation. He also wrote On Free Will, In Praise of Folly, Handbook of a Christian Knight, On Civility in Children, Copia: Foundations of the Abundant Style and many other works.

Erasmus lived against the backdrop of the growing European religious Reformation. He remained a member of the Catholic Church all his life, remaining committed to reforming the Church and its clerics' abuses from within. He also held to the doctrine of synergism, which some Reformers (Calvinists) rejected in favor of the doctrine of monergism. His middle-road approach disappointed, and even angered, scholars in both camps.

Erasmus died suddenly in Basel in 1536 while preparing to return to Brabant and was buried in Basel Minster, the former cathedral of the city.

Early life

Desiderius Erasmus is reported to have been born in Rotterdam on 28 October in the late 1460s, probably 1466. He was named after Saint Erasmus of Formiae, whom Erasmus's father Gerard personally favored. A 17th-century legend has it that Erasmus was first named Geert Geerts (also Gerhard Gerhards or Gerrit Gerritsz), but this is unfounded. A well-known wooden picture indicates: Goudæ conceptus, Roterodami natus (Latin for Conceived in Gouda, born in Rotterdam). According to an article by historian Renier Snooy (1478–1537), Erasmus was born in Gouda.

The exact year of his birth is controversial, but most agree it was in 1466. The Virtual International Authority File reveals the standard dates favoured by various national authorities. Evidence confirming the year of Erasmus's birth in 1466 can be found in his own words: fifteen out of twenty-three statements he made about his age indicate 1466. Although associated closely with Rotterdam, he lived there for only four years, never to return afterwards. Information on his family and early life comes mainly from vague references in his writings. His parents were not legally married. His father, Gerard, was a Catholic priest and curate in Gouda. His mother was Margaretha Rogerius (Latinized form of Dutch surname Rutgers), the daughter of a doctor from Zevenbergen. She may have been Gerard's housekeeper. Although he was born out of wedlock, Erasmus was cared for by his parents until their early deaths from the plague in 1483. This solidified his view of his origin as a stain  and cast a pall over his youth.

Erasmus was given the highest education available to a young man of his day, in a series of monastic or semi-monastic schools. In 1475, at the age of nine, he and his older brother Peter were sent to one of the best Latin schools in the Netherlands, located at Deventer and owned by the chapter clergy of the Lebuïnuskerk (St. Lebuin's Church), though some earlier biographies assert it was a school run by the Brethren of the Common Life. During his stay there the curriculum was renewed by the principal of the school, Alexander Hegius. For the first time ever in Europe, Greek was taught at a lower level than a university  and this is where he began learning it. He also gleaned there the importance of a personal relationship with God but eschewed the harsh rules and strict methods of the religious brothers and educators. His education there ended when plague struck the city about 1483, and his mother, who had moved to provide a home for her sons, died from the infection.

Ordination and monastic experience

Most likely in 1487, poverty forced Erasmus into the consecrated life as a canon regular of St. Augustine at the canonry of Stein, in South Holland. He took vows there in late 1488 and was ordained to the Catholic priesthood on 25 April 1492. It is said that he never seemed to have actively worked as a priest for a long time, and certain abuses in religious orders were among the chief objects of his later calls to reform the Church from within.

While at Stein, Erasmus supposedly fell in love with a fellow canon, Servatius Rogerus, and wrote a series of passionate letters in which he called Rogerus "half my soul," writing that "I have wooed you both unhappily and relentlessly." This correspondence contrasts sharply with the generally detached and much more restrained attitude he showed in his later life. Later, while tutoring in Paris, he was suddenly dismissed by the guardian of Thomas Grey. Some have taken this as evidence of an illicit affair. No personal denunciation was made of Erasmus during his lifetime, however, and he took pains in later life to distance these earlier episodes by condemning sodomy in his works, and praising sexual desire in marriage between men and women.

Soon after his priestly ordination he got his chance to leave the canonry when offered the post of secretary to the Bishop of Cambrai, Henry of Bergen, on account of his great skill in Latin and his reputation as a man of letters. To allow him to accept that post, he was given a temporary dispensation from his religious vows on the grounds of poor health and love of humanistic studies, though he remained a priest. Pope Leo X later made the dispensation permanent, a considerable privilege at the time.

Education and scholarship
In 1495 with Bishop Henry's consent and a stipend, Erasmus went on to study at the University of Paris in the Collège de Montaigu, a centre of reforming zeal, under the direction of the ascetic Jan Standonck, of whose rigors he complained. The university was then the chief seat of Scholastic learning but already coming under the influence of Renaissance humanism. For instance, Erasmus became an intimate friend of an Italian humanist Publio Fausto Andrelini, poet and "professor of humanity" in Paris.

In 1499 he was invited to England by William Blount, 4th Baron Mountjoy, who offered to accompany him on his trip to England. According to Thomas Penn, Erasmus was "ever susceptible to the charms of attractive, well-connected, and rich young men". His time in England was fruitful in the making of lifelong friendships with the leaders of English thought in the days of King Henry VIII: John Colet, Thomas More, John Fisher, Thomas Linacre and William Grocyn. Through the influence of the humanist John Colet, his interests turned towards theology. At the University of Cambridge, he was the Lady Margaret's Professor of Divinity and turned down the option of spending the rest of his life as a professor there. Erasmus stayed at Queens' College, from 1510 to 1515. His rooms were located in the "I" staircase of Old Court, and he showed a marked disdain for the ale and weather of England. With the aim to learn the Greek language in order to study the Christian origins in depth, he eventually departed England. 

Erasmus suffered from poor health and complained that Queens' College could not supply him with enough decent wine (wine was the Renaissance medicine for gallstones, from which Erasmus suffered). Until the early 20th century, Queens' College used to have a corkscrew that was purported to be "Erasmus's corkscrew", which was a third of a metre long; as of 1987, the college still had what it calls "Erasmus's chair". Today Queens' College also has an Erasmus Building and an Erasmus Room. His legacy is marked for someone who complained bitterly about the lack of comforts and luxuries to which he was accustomed. As Queens' was an unusually humanist-leaning institution in the 16th century, Queens' College Old Library still houses many first editions of Erasmus's publications, many of which were acquired during that period by bequest or purchase, including Erasmus's New Testament translation, which is signed by friend and Polish religious reformer Jan Łaski. From 1505 to 1508 Erasmus's friend, Chancellor John Fisher, was president of Queens' College. His friendship with Fisher is the reason he chose to stay at Queens' while lecturing in Greek at the university.

During his first visit to England in 1499, he taught at the University of Oxford. Erasmus was particularly impressed by the Bible teaching of John Colet, who pursued a style more akin to the church fathers than the Scholastics. This prompted him, upon his return from England, to master the Greek language, which would enable him to study theology on a more profound level and to prepare a new edition of Jerome's late-4th century Bible translation. On one occasion he wrote to Colet: I cannot tell you, dear Colet, how I hurry on, with all sails set, to holy literature. How I dislike everything that keeps me back, or retards me.Despite a chronic shortage of money, he succeeded in learning Greek by an intensive, day-and-night study of three years, continuously begging in letters that his friends send him books and money for teachers. Discovery in 1506 of Lorenzo Valla's New Testament Notes encouraged Erasmus to continue the study of the New Testament.

Erasmus preferred to live the life of an independent scholar and made a conscious effort to avoid any actions or formal ties that might inhibit his individual freedom. In England Erasmus was approached with prominent offices but he declined them all, until the King himself offered his support. He was inclined, but eventually did not accept and longed for a stay in Italy. He did however assist his friend John Colet by authoring Greek textbooks and procuring members of staff for the newly established St Paul's School. In 1506 he was able to accompany the sons of the Italian personal physician of the King to Italy. From 1506 onwards he was in Italy and he graduated as Doctor of Divinity from the University of Turin the same year. Erasmus then was present when Pope Julius II entered victorious into the conquered Bologna which he had besieged before. Erasmus travelled on to Venice, where an expanded version of his Adagia was printed by the famous printer Aldus Manutius. According to his letters, he was associated with the Venetian natural philosopher, Giulio Camillo, but apart from this he had a less active association with Italian scholars than might have been expected. 

His residence at Leuven, where he lectured at the University, exposed Erasmus to much criticism from those ascetics, academics and clerics hostile to the principles of literary and religious reform and to the loose norms of the Renaissance adherents to which he was devoting his life. In 1514, he made the acquaintance of Hermannus Buschius, Ulrich von Hutten and Johann Reuchlin who introduced him to the Hebrew language in Mainz. In 1517, he supported the foundation at the university of the Collegium Trilingue for the study of Hebrew, Latin, and Greek – after the model of the College of the Three Languages at the University of Alcalá by his friend Hieronymus van Busleyden. However, feeling that the lack of sympathy that prevailed at Leuven at that time was actually a form of mental persecution, he sought refuge in Basel, where under the shelter of Swiss hospitality he could express himself freely. Admirers from all quarters of Europe visited him there and he was surrounded by devoted friends, notably developing a lasting association with the great publisher Johann Froben and later his son Hieronymus Froben who together published over 200 works of his. His initial interest in Froben was aroused by his discovery of the printer's folio edition of the Adagiorum Chiliades tres (Adagia) (1513).

Spain's polyglot Bible and Erasmus's Greek New Testament

The first compilation of the Bible
In 1502 in Spain, Cardinal Francisco Jiménez de Cisneros had put together a team of Spanish translators to create a compilation of the Bible in four languages: Greek, Hebrew, Aramaic, and Latin. Translators from Greek were commissioned from Greece itself and worked closely with Latinists. Besides the compilation of the Bible, there was a new Latin text for the Vulgata. This text, which the Church Father Jerome had translated from Greek in the 4th century, was considered the only binding translation in the Catholic Church and was excluded from a new translation. Cardinal Cisneros's team completed and printed the full New Testament, including the Greek version, in 1514. To do so they developed specific types to print Greek. Cisneros informed Erasmus of the work going on in Spain and may have sent a printed version of the New Testament to him. However, the Spanish team wanted the entire Bible to be released as one single work and withdrew from publication.

Erasmus requested a "Publication Privilege" (copyright) for the Novum Instrumentum omne (The Greek New Testament with his Latin translation) to ensure that his work (all publications) would not be copied by other printers. He obtained it from Emperor Maximilian I 1516. In 1516 the Novum Instrumentum omne was also approved by Pope Leo X, to whom he would dedicate his work. Erasmus's Greek New Testament was published first, in 1516. Erasmus was invited by Cisneros to work on Complutensian Polyglot edition in 1517; also he offered him a bishop's office. But the Dutchman remained and never traveled to Spain.  

The Spanish copy was approved for publication by the Pope in 1520; however, it was not released until 1522 due to the team's insistence on reviewing and editing. Only fifteen errors have been found in the entire six volumes and four languages of Cisneros's bible, an extraordinarily low number for the time. The fear of their publishing first, though, affected Erasmus's work, rushing him to printing and causing him to forgo editing. The result was a large number of translation mistakes, transcription errors, and typos, that required further editions to be printed (see "publication").

The new Latin Translation of Erasmus
Erasmus had been working for years on two projects: a collation of Greek texts and a fresh Latin New Testament. In 1512, he began his work on this Latin New Testament. He collected all the Vulgate manuscripts he could find to create a critical edition. Then he polished the language. He declared, "It is only fair that Paul should address the Romans in somewhat better Latin." In the earlier phases of the project, he never mentioned a Greek text:

My mind is so excited at the thought of emending Jerome's text, with notes, that I seem to myself inspired by some god. I have already almost finished emending him by collating a large number of ancient manuscripts, and this I am doing at enormous personal expense.

While his intentions for publishing a fresh Latin translation are clear, it is less clear why he included the Greek text. Though some speculate that he intended to produce a critical Greek text or that he wanted to beat the Complutensian Polyglot into print, there is no evidence to support this. He wrote, "There remains the New Testament translated by me, with the Greek facing, and notes on it by me." He further demonstrated the reason for the inclusion of the Greek text when defending his work:

But one thing the facts cry out, and it can be clear, as they say, even to a blind man, that often through the translator's clumsiness or inattention the Greek has been wrongly rendered; often the true and genuine reading has been corrupted by ignorant scribes, which we see happen every day, or altered by scribes who are half-taught and half-asleep.

So he included the Greek text to permit qualified readers to verify the quality of his Latin version. But by first calling the final product Novum Instrumentum omne ("All of the New Teaching") and later Novum Testamentum omne ("All of the New Testament") he also indicated clearly that he considered a text in which the Greek and the Latin versions were consistently comparable to be the essential core of the church's New Testament tradition.

Contribution
In a way it is legitimate to say that Erasmus "synchronized" or "unified" the Greek and the Latin traditions of the New Testament by producing an updated translation of both simultaneously. Both being part of canonical tradition, he clearly found it necessary to ensure that both were actually present in the same content. In modern terminology, he made the two traditions "compatible". This is clearly evidenced by the fact that his Greek text is not just the basis for his Latin translation, but also the other way round: there are numerous instances where he edits the Greek text to reflect his Latin version. For instance, since the last six verses of Revelation were missing from his Greek manuscript, Erasmus translated the Vulgate's text back into Greek. Erasmus also retranslated the Latin text into Greek wherever he found that the Greek text and the accompanying commentaries were mixed up, or where he simply preferred the Vulgate's reading to the Greek text.

Publication and editions
Erasmus said it was "rushed into print rather than edited", resulting in a number of transcription errors. After comparing what writings he could find, Erasmus wrote corrections between the lines of the manuscripts he was using (among which was Minuscule 2) and sent them as proofs to Froben. His hurried effort was published by his friend Johann Froben of Basel in 1516 and thence became the first published Greek New Testament, the Novum Instrumentum omne, diligenter ab Erasmo Rot. Recognitum et Emendatum. Erasmus used several Greek manuscript sources because he did not have access to a single complete manuscript. Most of the manuscripts were, however, late Greek manuscripts of the Byzantine textual family and Erasmus used the oldest manuscript the least because "he was afraid of its supposedly erratic text." He also ignored much older and better manuscripts that were at his disposal.

In the second (1519) edition, the more familiar term Testamentum was used instead of Instrumentum. This edition was used by Martin Luther in his German translation of the Bible, written for people who could not understand Latin. Together, the first and second editions sold 3,300 copies. By comparison, only 600 copies of the Complutensian Polyglot were ever printed. The first and second edition texts did not include the passage (1 John 5:7–8) that has become known as the Comma Johanneum. Erasmus had been unable to find those verses in any Greek manuscript, but one was supplied to him during production of the third edition. The Catholic Church decreed that the Comma Johanneum was open to dispute (2 June 1927), and it is rarely included in modern scholarly translations.

The third edition of 1522 was probably used by Tyndale for the first English New Testament (Worms, 1526) and was the basis for the 1550 Robert Stephanus edition used by the translators of the Geneva Bible and King James Version of the English Bible. Erasmus published a fourth edition in 1527 containing parallel columns of Greek, Latin Vulgate and Erasmus's Latin texts. In this edition Erasmus also supplied the Greek text of the last six verses of Revelation (which he had translated from Latin back into Greek in his first edition) from Cardinal Ximenez's Biblia Complutensis. In 1535 Erasmus published the fifth (and final) edition which dropped the Latin Vulgate column but was otherwise similar to the fourth edition. Later versions of the Greek New Testament by others, but based on Erasmus's Greek New Testament, became known as the Textus Receptus.

Erasmus dedicated his work to Pope Leo X as a patron of learning and regarded this work as his chief service to the cause of Christianity. Immediately afterwards, he began the publication of his Paraphrases of the New Testament, a popular presentation of the contents of the several books. These, like all of his writings, were published in Latin but were quickly translated into other languages with his encouragement.

Erasmus, in his capacity as humanist editor, advised major printers such as Aldus Manutius on which manuscripts to publish.

Beginnings of Protestantism

Attempts at impartiality in dispute
The Protestant Reformation began in the year following the publication of his edition of the Greek New Testament (1516) and tested Erasmus's character. The issues between the Catholic Church and the growing religious movement which would later become known as Protestantism, had become so clear that few could escape the summons to join the debate. Erasmus, at the height of his literary fame, was inevitably called upon to take sides, but partisanship was foreign to his nature and his habits. Despite all his criticism of clerical corruption and abuses within the Catholic Church, which lasted for years and was also directed towards many of the Church's basic doctrines, Erasmus shunned the Reformation movement along with its most radical and reactionary offshoots, and sided with neither party.

The world had laughed at his satire, In Praise of Folly, but few had interfered with his activities. He believed that his work so far had commended itself to the best minds and also to the dominant powers in the religious world. Erasmus did not build a large body of supporters with his letters. He chose to write in Greek and Latin, the languages of scholars. His critiques reached an elite but small audience.

Disagreement with Luther
"Free will does not exist", according to Luther in his letter De Servo Arbitrio to Erasmus translated into German by Justus Jonas (1526), in that sin makes human beings completely incapable of bringing themselves to God. Noting Luther's criticism of the Catholic Church, Erasmus described him as "a mighty trumpet of gospel truth" while agreeing, "It is clear that many of the reforms for which Luther calls are urgently needed." He had great respect for Luther, and Luther spoke with admiration of Erasmus's superior learning. Luther hoped for his cooperation in a work which seemed only the natural outcome of his own. In their early correspondence, Luther expressed boundless admiration for all Erasmus had done in the cause of a sound and reasonable Christianity and urged him to join the Lutheran party. Erasmus declined to commit himself, arguing that to do so would endanger his position as a leader in the movement for pure scholarship which he regarded as his purpose in life. Only as an independent scholar could he hope to influence the reform of religion. When Erasmus hesitated to support him, the straightforward Luther became angered that Erasmus was avoiding the responsibility due either to cowardice or a lack of purpose. However, any hesitancy on the part of Erasmus may have stemmed, not from lack of courage or conviction, but rather from a concern over the mounting disorder and violence of the reform movement. To Philip Melanchthon in 1524 he wrote:

I know nothing of your church; at the very least it contains people who will, I fear, overturn the whole system and drive the princes into using force to restrain good men and bad alike. The gospel, the word of God, faith, Christ, and Holy Spirit – these words are always on their lips; look at their lives and they speak quite another language.

Again, in 1529, he writes "An epistle against those who falsely boast they are Evangelicals" to Vulturius Neocomus (Gerardus Geldenhouwer). Here Erasmus complains of the doctrines and morals of the Reformers:

You declaim bitterly against the luxury of priests, the ambition of bishops, the tyranny of the Roman Pontiff, and the babbling of the sophists; against our prayers, fasts, and Masses; and you are not content to retrench the abuses that may be in these things, but must needs abolish them entirely. ...Look around on this 'Evangelical' generation, and observe whether amongst them less indulgence is given to luxury, lust, or avarice, than amongst those whom you so detest. Show me any one person who by that Gospel has been reclaimed from drunkenness to sobriety, from fury and passion to meekness, from avarice to liberality, from reviling to well-speaking, from wantonness to modesty. I will show you a great many who have become worse through following it. ...The solemn prayers of the Church are abolished, but now there are very many who never pray at all. ...I have never entered their conventicles, but I have sometimes seen them returning from their sermons, the countenances of all of them displaying rage, and wonderful ferocity, as though they were animated by the evil spirit. ...Who ever beheld in their meetings any one of them shedding tears, smiting his breast, or grieving for his sins? ...Confession to the priest is abolished, but very few now confess to God. ...They have fled from Judaism that they may become Epicureans.

Apart from these perceived moral failings of the Reformers, Erasmus also dreaded any change in doctrine, citing the long history of the Church as a bulwark against innovation. In book I of his Hyperaspistes he puts the matter bluntly to Luther:
We are dealing with this: Would a stable mind depart from the opinion handed down by so many men famous for holiness and miracles, depart from the decisions of the Church, and commit our souls to the faith of someone like you who has sprung up just now with a few followers, although the leading men of your flock do not agree either with you or among themselves – indeed though you do not even agree with yourself, since in this same Assertion you say one thing in the beginning and something else later on, recanting what you said before.

Continuing his chastisement of Luther – and undoubtedly put off by the notion of there being "no pure interpretation of Scripture anywhere but in Wittenberg" – Erasmus touches upon another important point of the controversy:

You stipulate that we should not ask for or accept anything but Holy Scripture, but you do it in such a way as to require that we permit you to be its sole interpreter, renouncing all others. Thus the victory will be yours if we allow you to be not the steward but the lord of Holy Scripture.
Though he sought to remain firmly neutral in doctrinal disputes, each side accused him of siding with the other, perhaps because of his neutrality. It was not for lack of fidelity with either side but a desire for fidelity with them both:I detest dissension because it goes both against the teachings of Christ and against a secret inclination of nature. I doubt that either side in the dispute can be suppressed without grave loss.

In his catechism (entitled Explanation of the Apostles' Creed) (1533), Erasmus took a stand against Luther's teaching by asserting the unwritten Sacred Tradition as just as valid a source of revelation as the Bible, by enumerating the Deuterocanonical books in the canon of the Bible and by acknowledging seven sacraments. He identified anyone who questioned the perpetual virginity of Mary as blasphemous. However, he supported lay access to the Bible.

In a letter to Nikolaus von Amsdorf, Luther objected to Erasmus's catechism and called Erasmus a "viper," "liar," and "the very mouth and organ of Satan".

As regards the Reformation, Erasmus was accused by the monks to have: prepared the way and was responsible for Martin Luther. Erasmus, they said, had laid the egg, and Luther had hatched it. Erasmus wittily dismissed the charge, claiming that Luther had hatched a different bird entirely.

Free will
Twice in the course of the great discussion, he allowed himself to enter the field of doctrinal controversy, a field foreign to both his nature and his previous practices. One of the topics he dealt with was free will, a crucial question. In his De libero arbitrio diatribe sive collatio (1524), he lampoons the Lutheran view on free will. He lays down both sides of the argument impartially. This "Diatribe" did not encourage any definite action; this was its merit to the Erasmians and its fault in the eyes of the Lutherans. In response, Luther wrote his De servo arbitrio (On the Bondage of the Will, 1525), which attacks the "Diatribe" and Erasmus himself, going so far as to claim that Erasmus was not a Christian. Erasmus responded with a lengthy, two-part Hyperaspistes (1526–27). In this controversy Erasmus lets it be seen that he would like to claim more for free will than St. Paul and St. Augustine seem to allow according to Luther's interpretation. For Erasmus the essential point is that humans have the freedom of choice. The conclusions Erasmus reached drew upon a large array of notable authorities, including, from the Patristic period, Origen, John Chrysostom, Ambrose, Jerome, and Augustine, in addition to many leading Scholastic authors, such as Thomas Aquinas and Duns Scotus. The content of Erasmus's works also engaged with later thought on the state of the question, including the perspectives of the via moderna school and of Lorenzo Valla, whose ideas he rejected.

As the popular response to Luther gathered momentum, the social disorders, which Erasmus dreaded and Luther disassociated himself from, began to appear, including the German Peasants' War, the Anabaptist disturbances in Germany and in the Low Countries, iconoclasm, and the radicalisation of peasants across Europe. If these were the outcomes of reform, he was thankful that he had kept out of it. Yet he was ever more bitterly accused of having started the whole "tragedy" (as the Catholics dubbed Protestantism).

When the city of Basel definitely adopted the Reformation in 1529, Erasmus left Basel on the 13 April and departed by ship to the town of Freiburg im Breisgau. His departure was mainly because he feared his loss of impartiality and prominent reformators like Oekolampad urged him to stay.

Religious toleration
Certain works of Erasmus laid a foundation for religious toleration and ecumenism. For example, in De libero arbitrio, opposing certain views of Martin Luther, Erasmus noted that religious disputants should be temperate in their language, "because in this way the truth, which is often lost amidst too much wrangling may be more surely perceived." Gary Remer writes, "Like Cicero, Erasmus concludes that truth is furthered by a more harmonious relationship between interlocutors." Although Erasmus did not oppose the Catholic counter-Reformation and the punishment of heretics, in individual cases he generally argued for moderation and against the death penalty. He wrote, "It is better to cure a sick man than to kill him."

Sacraments
A test of the Reformation was the doctrine of the sacraments, and the crux of this question was the observance of the Eucharist. In 1530, Erasmus published a new edition of the orthodox treatise of Algerus against the heretic Berengar of Tours in the eleventh century. He added a dedication, affirming his belief in the reality of the Body of Christ after consecration in the Eucharist, commonly referred to as transubstantiation. The sacramentarians, headed by Œcolampadius of Basel, were, as Erasmus says, quoting him as holding views similar to their own in order to try to claim him for their schismatic and "erroneous" movement.

Writings
Erasmus wrote both on church subjects and those of general human interest. By the 1530s, the writings of Erasmus accounted for 10 to 20 percent of all book sales in Europe.

With the collaboration of Publio Fausto Andrelini, he formed a paremiography (collection) of Latin proverbs and adages, commonly titled Adagia. He is credited with coining the adage, "In the land of the blind, the one-eyed man is king." Erasmus is also generally credited with originating the phrase "Pandora's box", arising through an error in his translation of Hesiod's Pandora in which he confused pithos (storage jar) with pyxis (box).

His more serious writings begin early with the Enchiridion militis Christiani, the "Handbook of the Christian Soldier" (1503 – translated into English a few years later by the young William Tyndale). (A more literal translation of enchiridion – "dagger" – has been likened to "the spiritual equivalent of the modern Swiss Army knife.") In this short work, Erasmus outlines the views of the normal Christian life, which he was to spend the rest of his days elaborating. The chief evil of the day, he says, is formalism – going through the motions of tradition without understanding their basis in the teachings of Christ. Forms can teach the soul how to worship God, or they may hide or quench the spirit. In his examination of the dangers of formalism, Erasmus discusses monasticism, saint worship, war, the spirit of class and the foibles of "society." The Enchiridion is more like a sermon than a satire. With it Erasmus challenged common assumptions, painting the clergy as educators who should share the treasury of their knowledge with the laity. He emphasized personal spiritual disciplines and called for a reformation which he characterized as a collective return to the Fathers and Scripture. Most importantly, he extolled the reading of scripture as vital because of its power to transform and motivate toward love. Much like the Brethren of the Common Life, he wrote that the New Testament is the law of Christ people are called to obey and that Christ is the example they are called to imitate.

According to Ernest Barker, "Besides his work on the New Testament, Erasmus laboured also, and even more arduously, on the early Fathers. Among the Latin Fathers he edited the works of St Jerome, St Hilary, and St Augustine; among the Greeks he worked on Irenaeus, Origen and Chrysostom."

Erasmus also wrote of the legendary Frisian freedom fighter and rebel Pier Gerlofs Donia (Greate Pier), though more often in criticism than in praise of his exploits. Erasmus saw him as a dim, brutal man who preferred physical strength to wisdom.

Erasmus's best-known work is The Praise of Folly, written in 1509, published in 1511 under the double title Moriae encomium (Greek, Latinised) and Laus stultitiae (Latin). It is inspired by De triumpho stultitiae written by Italian humanist Faustino Perisauli. A satirical attack on superstitions and other traditions of European society in general and the western Church in particular, it was dedicated to Sir Thomas More, whose name the title puns.

The Institutio principis Christiani  or "Education of a Christian Prince" (Basel, 1516) was written as advice to the young king Charles of Spain (later Charles V, Holy Roman Emperor). Erasmus applies the general principles of honor and sincerity to the special functions of the Prince, whom he represents throughout as the servant of the people. Education was published in 1516, three years after Niccolò Machiavelli's The Prince was written; a comparison between the two is worth noting. Machiavelli stated that, to maintain control by political force, it is safer for a prince to be feared than loved. Erasmus preferred for the prince to be loved, and strongly suggested a well-rounded education in order to govern justly and benevolently and avoid becoming a source of oppression.

As a result of his reformatory activities, Erasmus found himself at odds with both of the great parties. His last years were embittered by controversies with men toward whom he was sympathetic. Notable among these was Ulrich von Hutten, a brilliant but erratic genius who had thrown himself into the Lutheran cause and declared that Erasmus, if he had a spark of honesty, would do the same. In his reply in 1523, Spongia adversus aspergines Hutteni, Erasmus displays his skill in semantics. He accuses Hutten of having misinterpreted his utterances about reform and reiterates his determination never to break with the Church.

The writings of Erasmus exhibit a continuing concern with language, and in 1525 he devoted an entire treatise to the subject, Lingua. This and several of his other works are said to have provided a starting point for a philosophy of language, though Erasmus did not produce a completely elaborated system.

The Ciceronianus came out in 1528, attacking the style of Latin that was based exclusively and fanatically on Cicero's writings. Étienne Dolet wrote a riposte titled Erasmianus in 1535.

Erasmus's last major work, published the year of his death, is the Ecclesiastes or "Gospel Preacher" (Basel, 1536), a massive manual for preachers of around a thousand pages. Though somewhat unwieldy because Erasmus was unable to edit it properly in his old age, it is in some ways the culmination of all of Erasmus's literary and theological learning, offering prospective preachers advice on nearly every conceivable aspect of their vocation with extraordinarily abundant reference to classical and biblical sources.

Sileni Alcibiadis (1515)
Erasmus's Sileni Alcibiadis is one of his most direct assessments of the need for Church reform. Johann Froben published it first within a revised edition of the Adagia in 1515, then as a stand-alone work in 1517. This essay has been likened to John Colet's Convocation Sermon, though the styles differ.

Sileni is the plural (Latin) form of Silenus, a creature often related to the Roman wine god Bacchus and represented in pictorial art as inebriated, merry revellers, variously mounted on donkeys, singing, dancing, playing flutes, etc. Alcibiades was a Greek politician in the 5th century BCE and a general in the Peloponnesian War; he figures here more as a character written into some of Plato's dialogues – a young, debauched playboy whom Socrates tries to convince to seek truth instead of pleasure, wisdom instead of pomp and splendor.

The term Sileni – especially when juxtaposed with the character of Alcibiades – can therefore be understood as an evocation of the notion that something on the inside is more expressive of a person's character than what one sees on the outside. For instance, something or someone ugly on the outside can be beautiful on the inside, which is one of the main points of Plato's dialogues featuring Alcibiades and the Symposion, in which Alcibiades also appears.

In support of this, Erasmus states, "Anyone who looks closely at the inward nature and essence will find that nobody is further from true wisdom than those people with their grand titles, learned bonnets, splendid sashes and bejeweled rings, who profess to be wisdom's peak." On the other hand, Erasmus lists several Sileni and then questions whether Christ is the most noticeable Silenus of them all. The Apostles were Sileni since they were ridiculed by others. He believes that the things which are the least ostentatious can be the most significant, and that the Church constitutes all Christian people – that despite contemporary references to clergy as the whole of the Church, they are merely its servants. He criticizes those that spend the Church's riches at the people's expense. The true point of the Church is to help people lead Christian lives. Priests are supposed to be pure, yet when they stray, no one condemns them. He criticizes the riches of the popes, believing that it would be better for the Gospel to be most important.

Alleged Erasmus forger 

In 1530, Erasmus, in his fourth edition of the works of Saint Cyprian, introduced a treatise De duplici martyrio ad Fortunatum, which he attributed to Saint Cyprian and presented as having been found by chance in an old library. This text, close to the works of Erasmus, both in content (hostility to the confusion between virtue and suffering) and in form, and of which no manuscript is known, contains at least one flagrant anachronism: an allusion to the persecution of Diocletian, persecution that took place long after the death of Saint Cyprian. In 1544, the Dominican  denounced the work as inauthentic and attributed its authorship to Erasmus or an imitator of Erasmus. In the twentieth century, the hypothesis of a fraud by Erasmus was rejected a priori by most of the great Erasmians, for example Percy Stafford Allen, but it is adopted by academics like Anthony Grafton.

Death

When his strength began to fail, he decided to accept an invitation by Queen Mary of Hungary, Regent of the Netherlands, to move from Freiburg to Brabant. However, during preparations for the move in 1536, he suddenly died from an attack of dysentery during a visit to Basel. He had remained loyal to the papal authorities in Rome, but he did not have the opportunity to receive the last rites of the Catholic Church; the reports of his death do not mention whether he asked for a priest or not. According to Jan van Herwaarden, this is consistent with his view that outward signs were not important; what mattered is the believer's direct relationship with God, which he noted "as the [Catholic] church believes". However, Herwaarden observes that "he did not dismiss the rites and sacraments out of hand but asserted a dying person could achieve a state of salvation without the priestly rites, provided their faith and spirit were attuned to God." His last words, as recorded by his friend Beatus Rhenanus, were apparently "Dear God". He was buried with great ceremony in the Basel Minster (the former cathedral). As his heir he instated Bonifacius Amerbach.

Legacy
The popularity of his books is reflected in the number of editions and translations that have appeared since the sixteenth century. Ten columns of the catalogue of the British Library are taken up with the enumeration of the works and their subsequent reprints. The greatest names of the classical and patristic world are among those translated, edited, or annotated by Erasmus, including Saint Ambrose, Aristotle, Saint Augustine, Saint Basil, Saint John Chrysostom, Cicero and Saint Jerome.

In his native Rotterdam, the Erasmus University Rotterdam and Gymnasium Erasmianum have been named in his honor. Between 1997 and 2009, one of the main metro lines of the city was named Erasmuslijn. In 2003 a poll showing that most Rotterdammers believed Erasmus to be the designer of the local Erasmus Bridge, instigated the founding of the Foundation Erasmus House (Rotterdam), dedicated to celebrating Erasmus's legacy. Three moments in Erasmus's life are celebrated annually. On 1 April, the city celebrates the publication of his best-known book The Praise of Folly. On 11 July, the Night of Erasmus celebrates the lasting influence of his work. His birthday is celebrated on 28 October.

Erasmus's reputation and the interpretations of his work have varied over time. Moderate Catholics recognized him as a leading figure in attempts to reform the Church, while Protestants recognized his initial support for Luther's ideas and the groundwork he laid for the future Reformation, especially in biblical scholarship. By the 1560s, however, there was a marked change in reception.  

According to Franz Anton Knittel, Erasmus in his Novum Instrumentum omne did not incorporate the Comma from the Codex Montfortianus (concerning the Trinity), because of grammar differences, but used the Complutensian Polyglot. According to him the Comma was known to Tertullian.

Protestant views of Erasmus fluctuated depending on region and period, with continual support in his native Netherlands and in cities of the Upper Rhine area. However, following his death and in the late sixteenth century, many Reformation supporters saw Erasmus's critiques of Luther and lifelong support for the universal Catholic Church as damning, and second-generation Protestants were less vocal in their debts to the great humanist. Nevertheless, his reception is demonstrable among Swiss Protestants in the sixteenth century: he had an indelible influence on the biblical commentaries of, for example, Konrad Pellikan, Heinrich Bullinger, and John Calvin, all of whom used both his annotations on the New Testament and his paraphrases of same in their own New Testament commentaries.

However, Erasmus designated his own legacy, and his life works were turned over at his death to his friend the Protestant humanist turned remonstrator Sebastian Castellio for the repair of the breach and divide of Christianity in its Catholic, Anabaptist, and Protestant branches.

By the coming of the Age of Enlightenment, however, Erasmus increasingly again became a more widely respected cultural symbol and was hailed as an important figure by increasingly broad groups. In a letter to a friend, Erasmus once had written: "That you are patriotic will be praised by many and easily forgiven by everyone; but in my opinion it is wiser to treat men and things as though we held this world the common fatherland of all." Thus, the universalist ideals of Erasmus are sometimes claimed to be important for fixing global governance.

Several schools, faculties and universities in the Netherlands and Belgium are named after him, as is Erasmus Hall in Brooklyn, New York, USA.

Erasmus is credited with saying "When I get a little money I buy books; and if any is left, I buy food and clothes."

He is also blamed for the mistranslation from Greek of "to call a bowl a bowl" as "to call a spade a spade".

The European Erasmus Programme of exchange students within the European Union is named after him. The Erasmus Programme scholarships enable students to spend up to a year of their university courses in a university in another European country.

Clothing 
Since about 1517, after he left the monastery, he chose to wear the clothes he preferred. He preferred warm and soft garments. He wore a modified habit of the Augustine order, which he ordered to be stuffed with fur so it will protect him against the cold. The habit counted with a collar of fur which usually covered his nape. His headgear was exceptional at the time, as it was upholstered at the back. This may have been due to the shape of Erasmus' head, which was rather flat at the back. This assumption comes due to an inspection of his skull, when his tomb in Basel was unearthed in 1928 and for his own writings about it and caricatures of his own head.

Signet ring and personal motto 

Erasmus has chosen the Roman god of the borders Terminus as a personal symbol and had a signet ring with a herm he thought included a depiction of Terminus carved into a carnelian. The herm was presented to him in Rome by his student Alexander Stewart and in reality depicted the Greek god Dionysus. The ring was also depicted in a portrait of his by the Flemish painter Quentin Matsys. Likewise, he chose Concedo Nulli (Lat. I concede to no-one) as his personal motto. In the early 1530s, Erasmus was portrayed as Terminus by Hans Holbein the Younger.

Representations

 Hans Holbein painted him at least three times and perhaps as many as seven, some of the Holbein portraits of Erasmus surviving only in copies by other artists. Holbein's three profile portraits – two (nearly identical) profile portraits and one three-quarters-view portrait – were all painted in the same year, 1523. Erasmus used the Holbein portraits as gifts for his friends in England, such as William Warham, the Archbishop of Canterbury. (Writing in a letter to Wareham regarding the gift portrait, Erasmus quipped that "he might have something of Erasmus should God call him from this place.") Erasmus spoke favourably of Holbein as an artist and person but was later critical, accusing him of sponging off various patrons whom Erasmus had recommended, for purposes more of monetary gain than artistic endeavor.
 Albrecht Dürer also produced portraits of Erasmus, whom he met three times, in the form of an engraving of 1526 and a preliminary charcoal sketch. Concerning the former Erasmus was unimpressed, declaring it an unfavorable likeness of him. Nevertheless, Erasmus and Dürer maintained a close friendship, with Dürer going so far as to solicit Erasmus's support for the Lutheran cause, which Erasmus politely declined. Erasmus wrote a glowing encomium about the artist, likening him to famous Greek painter of antiquity Apelles. Erasmus was deeply affected by his death in 1528.
 Quentin Matsys produced the earliest known portraits of Erasmus, including an oil painting in 1517 and a medal in 1519.
 In 1622, Hendrick de Keyser cast a statue of Erasmus in bronze replacing an earlier stone version from 1557. This was set up in the public square in Rotterdam, and today may be found outside the St. Lawrence Church. It is the oldest bronze statue in the Netherlands.

Works

 Adagia (1500)
 Enchiridion militis Christiani (1503)
 Stultitiae Laus (Praise of Folly (1511)
 De Utraque Verborum ac Rerum Copia (1512)
 Sileni Alcibiadis (1515)
 Novum Instrumentum omne (1516)
 Institutio principis Christiani (1516)
 Querela pacis (1517)
 Colloquia (1518)
 Lingua, Sive, De Linguae usu atque abusu Liber utillissimus ("Language, or the uses and abuses of language, a most useful book") (1525)
 Ciceronianus (1528)
 De recta Latini Graecique sermonis pronuntiatione (1528)
 De pueris statim ac liberaliter instituendis (1529)
 De civilitate morum puerilium (1530)
 Consultatio de Bello Turcis Inferendo (1530)
 De praeparatione ad mortem (1533)
 A Playne and Godly Exposition or Declaration of the Commune Crede (1533)
 Ecclesiastes (1535)
 De octo orationis partium constructione libellus (1536)
 Apophthegmatum opus (1539)
 The first tome or volume of the Paraphrase of Erasmus vpon the newe testamente (1548)

See also
 Erasmus House, a museum in Anderlecht (Brussels) dedicated to the humanist's life and work
 Erasmus Student Network
 List of Erasmus's correspondents
 Mammotrectus super Bibliam
Rodolphus Agricola
 Textus Receptus

Notes

References

Further reading
MacPhail, Eric (ed). A Companion to Erasmus (Leiden and Boston: Brill, 2023).
Gulik, Egbertus van. Erasmus and His Books (Toronto: University of Toronto Press, 2018).
 McDonald, Grantley. Biblical Criticism in Early Modern Europe: Erasmus, the Johannine Comma, and Trinitarian Debate (Cambridge and New York: Cambridge University Press, 2016)
 Christ-von Wedel, Christine. Erasmus of Rotterdam: Advocate of a New Christianity (Toronto: University of Toronto Press, 2013)
 Bietenholz, Peter G. Encounters with a Radical Erasmus. Erasmus' Work as a Source of Radical Thought in Early Modern Europe (Toronto: University of Toronto Press, 2009)
 Dodds, Gregory D. Exploiting Erasmus: The Erasmian Legacy and Religious Change in Early Modern England (Toronto: University of Toronto Press, 2009)
 
 Furey, Constance M. Erasmus, Contarini, and the Religious Republic of Letters. Cambridge and New York: Cambridge University Press, 2006.
 Huizinga, Johan. Erasmus and the Age of Reformation, with a Selection from the Letters of Erasmus, in series, Harper Torchbacks, and also in The Cloister Library. New York: Harper & Row, 1957. xiv, 266 pp.
 Quinones, Ricardo J. Erasmus and Voltaire: Why They Still Matter (University of Toronto Press; 2010) 240 pp. Draws parallels between the two thinkers as voices of moderation with relevance today.
 Swan, Jesse G. "Erasmus, Calin, Reading and Living," in: Cahier Calin: Makers of the Middle Ages. Essays in Honor of William Calin , ed. Richard Utz and Elizabeth Emery (Kalamazoo, MI: Studies in Medievalism, 2011), pp. 5–7.
 Winters, Adam. Erasmus' Doctrine of Free Will. Jackson, TN: Union University Press, 2005.
 Zweig, Stefan Erasmus of Rotterdam. Translated by Eden and Cedar Paul. (Garden City Publishing Co., Inc; 1937)
  The first modern Parallel Greek New Testament, using Erasmus's 1522 edition (used by Tyndale and the King James writers).
 Garcia-Villoslada, Ricardo. 'Loyola y Erasmo, Taurus Ediciones, Madrid, Spain, 1965.
 Lorenzo Cortesi, Esortazione alla filosofia. La Paraclesis di Erasmo da Rotterdam, Ravenna, SBC Edizioni, 2012, 
 Pep Mayolas, Erasme i la construcció catalana d'Espanya, Barcelona, Llibres de l'Índex, 2014
 Payne, John B., Erasmus, His Theology of the Sacraments, Research in Theology 1970

Primary sources
 Collected Works of Erasmus (U of Toronto Press, 1974–2011). 78 volumes published thus far; see U. Toronto Press, in English translation
 The Correspondence of Erasmus (U of Toronto Press, 1975–2011), 14 volumes down to 1528 are published
 Rabil, Albert. "Erasmus: Recent Critical Editions and Translations," Renaissance Quarterly 54#1 2001. Discusses both the Toronto translation and the entirely separate Latin edition published in Amsterdam since 1969 (online edition)
 Desiderius Erasmus: “War is sweet to those who have no experience of it …” - Protest against Violence and War (= Publication series: Exhibitions on the History of Nonviolent Resistance, No. 1, Editors: Christian Bartolf, Dominique Miething). Berlin: Freie Universität Berlin, 2022. PDF

External links

 
 
 
 
 
 
 Index of Erasmus's Opera Omnia (Latin)
 
 
 
 Opera (Latin Library)
 In Our Time podcast from BBC Radio 4 with Melvyn Bragg, and guests Diarmaid MacCulloch, Eamon Duffy, and Jill Kraye.
 Joseph Sauer: Desiderius Erasmus (Article in the Catholic Encyclopedia, 1909)
 James D. Tracy: Erasmus of the Low Countries, Berkeley – Los Angeles – London: University of California Press 1997
 Desiderius Erasmus: "War is sweet to those who have no experience of it ..." Protest against Violence and War – Online-Exhibition (2017)

 
1460s births
1536 deaths
Roman Catholic priests of the Habsburg Netherlands
16th-century Dutch Roman Catholic priests
15th-century Latin writers
16th-century Latin-language writers
15th-century Dutch philosophers
16th-century Dutch philosophers
Augustinian canons
Former members of Catholic religious institutes
Catholic philosophers
Christian humanists
Counter-Reformation
Critics of the Catholic Church
Dutch educators
Dutch essayists
Dutch Renaissance humanists
Dutch rhetoricians
Dutch satirists
Historians of the Catholic Church
People from Gouda, South Holland
Writers from Rotterdam
Translators of the Bible into Latin
Academic staff of the Old University of Leuven
Alumni of Queens' College, Cambridge
Old University of Leuven alumni
Deaths from dysentery
Burials at Basel Münster
Greek–Latin translators
Proverb scholars
Paremiologists
Lady Margaret's Professors of Divinity
16th-century Christian biblical scholars
15th-century Christian biblical scholars
Dutch expatriates in England
Dutch expatriates in France
University of Paris alumni
University of Turin alumni
Proto-Protestants